The Men's 200m T44 had its whole competition held on September 13, with the First Round at 10:26 and the Final at 19:00.

Medalists

Results

References
Round 1 - Heat 1
Round 1 - Heat 2
Final

Athletics at the 2008 Summer Paralympics